"Hard to See" is a song by American heavy metal band Five Finger Death Punch. The song was released as the first single from their second album War Is the Answer, and their fourth single overall. The single was released on July 21, 2009.

It is their fourth-highest charted single to date, peaking at number eight on the Mainstream Rock chart. It is the band's third top-ten single. It also reached number 28 on the Billboard Rock Songs chart and number 40 on the Alternative Songs chart, their first appearance on either chart.

Background
The song is about people being too attached to opinions they've formed on limited amounts of information. Guitarist Zoltan Bathory explained: "It's about seemingly irresolvable differences. It's valid in just about any setting: politics, religion, relationships… Everything is 'only an opinion' based on limited information, yet people sometimes get attached to their point of views to the extreme… in fact, to the point they would launch wars over them."

It began streaming on July 9, 2009, through Revolvers website. The song began to receive radio airplay on July 13, 2009.

The music video for the song premiered on August 28, 2009.

The song is available for download for the Rock Band series through the Rock Band Network. The song appeared as an on-disc track in Guitar Hero: Warriors of Rock. It was also in the soundtrack for the video game MLB 2K11. The song has been used in multiple NASCAR Racing 2003 Season crash videos on YouTube.

Track listing

CD single

UK 7-inch

DJ edition

Personnel
Ivan Moody – vocals
Jason Hook – lead guitar, backing vocals
Zoltan Bathory – rhythm guitar
Matt Snell – bass, backing vocals
Jeremy Spencer – drums

References

2009 singles
2009 songs
Five Finger Death Punch songs
Song recordings produced by Kevin Churko
Songs written by Zoltan Bathory
Songs written by Ivan Moody (vocalist)
Songs written by Jason Hook
Songs written by Jeremy Spencer (drummer)